Carbuss - Indústria de Carrocerias Catarinense Ltda. is a Brazilian bus manufacturer.

History

The business had its origins in a firm created on the purchase of the Joinville factory. For the business is to be deposited R$ 9.4 million in cash and another R$ 57.74 million to be paid in 52 installments with monetary correction. On June 12, 2017 the company received the name Carbuss - Indústria de Carrocerias Catarinense Ltda. By the year 2018, 500 employees must be hired. After five years of stop, the factory would return to produce buses from 2018 with investments that would go from BRL 100 million. After all the material goes through evaluation to see what can still be used, begins the hiring of the production staff.

80 employees works in engineering and in mechanical and building maintenance. The production of buses would occur in the first half of 2018.

Some ten thousand resumes have already been received, and preference was given to employees who have been dismissed by the former Busscar administration.

Owner said that had a complete redesign of the product line, including the commercial names of the models, but following old Busscar, with the quality and differentiated design that has always marked the company. Thus, some lines of the design is to be modified, but following the traditional design of the bodies. The new products had been updated in  functional, as from Euro 3 to 5, and aesthetic solutions, but without losing the DNA of Busscar's lines and finishes.

Investor group acquired the Busscar brand, equipment, projects and industrial parks. The company assumed  none of the old debts. Busscar Colombia continues to operate as an independent company. Although 'Caio' and 'Busscar' are different companies, synergy in the performance of both, technology exchanges, utilisation of sales structure, logistics, etc. are common.

Ten months after the acquisition, the new owners had already hired 180 employees and the goal is to have 500 to 800 employees until the end of 2018.

The production line started on May 2, 2018 with three buses, Vissta Bus 360 to Viação Paraty, in Araraquara Brazil, a customer who asked to receive the car No. 001, a Vissta Bus 340 for Viação Osasco, to run in the Greater São Paulo, EMTU line (Metropolitan Urban Transport Company) and a Vissta Bus DD demonstrative.

Models

El Buss 320 2019
Vissta Buss 340
Vissta Buss 360
Vissta Buss 400 LD
Vissta Buss DD

References

External links

Bus manufacturers of Brazil
Vehicle manufacturing companies established in 2017
Companies based in Joinville
Brazilian brands
Brazilian companies established in 2017